The 1926 Wesley Wildcats football team represented Wesley Collegiate Institute (later known as Wesley College) in the 1926 college football season as an independent. Led by coach Josh S. Faulkner in their first season since 1909, the Wildcats compiled a 6–1 record, outscoring their opponents 129 to 27. Chism was team captain and Ray Torrey was quarterback. Torrey was considered by some to be the best quarterback in the state of Delaware.

Schedule

References

Wesley
Wesley Wolverines football seasons
Wesley Wildcats football